Sándor Sallai (born 26 March 1960, Debrecen) is a Hungarian retired professional footballer who played as a defender.

He made his début for the Hungary national team in 1981, and was awarded 55 caps, and scored one goal, up to 1989. Sallai was a participant at the 1982 and 1986 FIFA World Cups where Hungary, on both occasions, failed to progress from the first stage.

Personal life
His nephew is Roland Sallai.

References

1960 births
Living people
Sportspeople from Debrecen
Hungarian footballers
Association football defenders
Hungary international footballers
1982 FIFA World Cup players
1986 FIFA World Cup players
Debreceni VSC players
Budapest Honvéd FC players